Adam Adamowicz (March 9, 1968 – February 9, 2012) was an American video game concept artist, best known for his work on The Elder Scrolls IV: Oblivion, Fallout 3, and The Elder Scrolls V: Skyrim at Bethesda Softworks. He grew up on Long Island, New York and was of Polish descent.

Before entering the games industry Adamowicz undertook freelance work for Dark Horse Comics' New Recruits anthology and also worked on Fantagrafics Books' Duplex Planet.  He produced cover illustrations for Malibu Graphics. He worked with Jaleco Entertainment, Inc. between 2002-2003.  Adam started working at Bethesda Softworks in 2005. Adamowicz was the only concept artist to work on Fallout 3 and one of two, alongside Ray Lederer, for The Elder Scrolls V: Skyrim at Bethesda Softworks. His concept art and imagery were used in Fallout 4s development.

Adamowicz died from complications of lung cancer on February 9, 2012, aged 43.

Credited works
Nightcaster: Defeat the Darkness (2001), Microsoft Corporation
NightCaster II: Equinox (2002), Jaleco
Goblin Commander: Unleash the Horde (2003), Jaleco

Bethesda Softworks
The Elder Scrolls IV: Oblivion (2006), Bethesda Softworks
Fallout 3 (2008), Bethesda Softworks
The Elder Scrolls V: Skyrim (2011), Bethesda Softworks
Fallout 4 (2015), Bethesda Softworks

References

External links
Bethesda Softworks tribute page
Adam Adamowicz's Skyrim concept images
MobyGames entry
Adam Adamowicz's post-apocalyptic Fallout 3 concept art

1968 births
2012 deaths
American illustrators
American people of Polish descent
Bethesda Softworks employees
Deaths from lung cancer in Washington, D.C.